Jim McCrary (August 31, 1939 – April 29, 2012) was an American photographer known for his 1970s album covers, most notably Carole King's Tapestry, The Carpenters' Ticket to Ride, and Joe Cocker's Mad Dogs and Englishmen.

References

External links
 Obituary

1939 births
2012 deaths
American photographers
Album-cover and concert-poster artists